The N55 road is a national secondary road in Ireland linking Athlone to Cavan town.

Athlone - Ballymahon upgrade
In October 2017, a public consultation began into the re-routing of the Athlone to Ballymahon section of the road. The route affects areas such as Annaghgortagh, and Kilkenny West Plans were still in development in summer 2018.

Route
(Southwest to Northeast)
 It starts at a grade separated interchange (Junction 4) on the N6 Athlone by-pass in County Westmeath and runs northwest through Ballymahon, crossing the N4 at Edgeworthstown, County Longford, through Granard, County Longford and northwest to Ballinagh, County Cavan before terminating at a roundabout junction with the N3 in Cavan town.

See also
Roads in Ireland

References

Roads Act 1993 (Classification of National Roads) Order 2006 – Department of Transport

National secondary roads in the Republic of Ireland
Roads in County Westmeath
Roads in County Longford
Roads in County Cavan